HMS Centurion was one of six 40-gun fourth-rate frigates, built for the Commonwealth of England under the 1650 Programme, she would be transferred to the navy of the Kingdom of England upon the Restoration of the monarchy in May 1660. When commissioned she partook in the First Anglo-Dutch War. After the first war ended she was in the Mediterranean fighting the Algerines at the Battle of Santa Cruz. She fought the battles of Dover, Portland, the Gabbard, and Scheveningen. During the Second Anglo-Dutch War she partook in the battles of Lowestoft and Orfordness. Following the second war she spent her time either in North America or the Mediterranean. She was wrecked in a storm in December 1689.

Centurion was the first named vessel in the English and Royal Navy.

Construction and specifications
She was one of six frigates ordered in December 1649. She would be built under contract by Peter Pett I of Ratcliffe at a contract price of £6.10.0d per ton. She was launched in 1650. Her tonnage was  tons.

Her gun armament in 1653 was 50 guns. In 1666 her armament was 48 guns and consisted of twenty culverins on the lower deck (LD), twenty-two demi-culverines on the upper deck two 6-pounder guns and four sakers on the quarterdeck (QD). In 1677 her gun establishment was unchanged except now the upper deck was suppose to have 8-pounder guns but she actually carried 6-pounder guns. By 1681 her gun count had risen to 52 guns consisting of twenty-two culverins, twenty-two 8-pounder guns and eight minions. Under the 1685 Establishment her guns had dropped to 50 guns consisting of twenty-two culverin drakes, twenty two 8-pounder guns and six saker cutts. Her manning was 180 personnel in 1653 and remained so until 1688 when it was 230/200/150 personnel.

She was complete at an initial cost of £3,451.10.0d.

Commissioned service

Service in the Commonwealth Navy
She was commissioned in 1650 under the command of Captain William Penn. In 1651 she was under Captain John Lawson for service in Scottish Waters. Later in the year she sail with William Penn's Squadron to the Mediterranean.

First Anglo-Dutch War
In 1652 she was under Captain Walter Wood. She was at the Battle of Dover on 19 May 1652. She followed that with the Battle of Portland as a member of Robert Blakes Squadron on the 18 February 1653. She was involved in the Battle of the Gabbard as a member of White Squadron, Van Division on 2-3 June 1653. She partook in the Battle of Scheveningen as a member of White Squadron, Van Division on 25 July 1653. Later in 1653 she was under Captain Robert Nixon for the winter of 1653/54 on the Dutch coast.

She joined Robert Blake's Fleet in the Mediterranean in 1655. In 1656 she was under the command of Captain Anthony Spatchurst. She was at the Battle of Santa Cruz on 20 April 1657. During 1659/60 she was under command of Captain Francis Parke for operations in the Sound.

Service After the Restoration May 1660
Later in 1660 she was under the command of Captain John Coppin. On 22 March 1661 she under Captain Christopher Myngs until 2 September 1663.

Second Anglo-Dutch War
On 17 August 1664 she was under command of Captain Robert Moulton. As a member of Blue Squadron, Center Division she participated in the Battle of Lowestoft on 3 June 1665. On 13 June 1665 she was under Captain Daniel Helling. On 25 August 1665 she was under command of Captain Mark Harrison. Captain John Hubbard took over on 22 February 1666. She partook in the St James Day Battle as a member of White Squadron, Van Division from 25 June to 6 July 1666. Captain Charles Wylde took over on 7 July 1666 until 19 March 1667.

In 1668 She was under command of Captain William Coleman. On 9 April 1669 she was under Captain Peter Bowen sailing with Sir Thomas Allin's squadron in the Mediterranean. On 1 February 1673 Captain Wylde took command once more (until 3 October 1674) remaining in the Mediterranean. Captain Roger Strickland was her commander from 23 November to 24 December 1677. Captain Richard Carter was her commander from 11 January 1678 to 24 October 1681. Captain Ralph Wrenn took over on 12 June 1682 for a newfoundland convoy in 1682 then for service in Home Waters until 17 August 1685. In August 1688 she returned to active service under Captain Thomas Ashton quickly followed by Captain Francis Wheeler in September and later in 1688 Captain Edward Elliot. On 21 April 1689 she came under command of Captain Basil Beaumont.

Loss
She was wrecked in a storm in Plymouth Sound on 25 December 1689.

Notes

Citations

References

 Lavery, Brian (2003) The Ship of the Line - Volume 1: The development of the battlefleet 1650-1850. Conway Maritime Press. .
 British Warships in the Age of Sail (1603 – 1714), by Rif Winfield, published by Seaforth Publishing, England © Rif Winfield 2009, EPUB ISBN 978-1-78346-924-6
 Fleet Actions, 1.1 Battle of Dover
 Fleet Actions, 1.5 Battle off Portland (the 'Three Days' Battle')
 Fleet Actions, 1.7 Battle of the Gabbard (North Foreland)
 Fleet Actions, 1.8 Battle of Scheveningen (off Texel)
 Fleet Actions, 2.2 Battle of Santa Cruz
 Fleet Actions, 3.1 Battle of Lowestoft
 Fleet Actions, 3.4 Battle of Orfordness ('the St James Day Battle')
 Chapter 4, The Fourth Rates - 'Small Ships', Vessels acquired from 24 March 1603, 1650 Programme, Centurion
 Colledge, Ships of the Royal Navy, by J.J. Colledge, revised and updated by Lt Cdr Ben Warlow and Steve Bush, published by Seaforth Publishing, Barnsley, Great Britain, © 2020, EPUB , Section R (Reserve)
 The Arming and Fitting of English Ships of War 1600 - 1815, by Brian Lavery, published by US Naval Institute Press © Brian Lavery 1989, Part V Guns, Type of Guns

Ships of the line of the Royal Navy
Ships built in Ratcliff
Shipwrecks
1650s ships
17th-century maritime incidents
Maritime incidents in 1689